The canton of Vouvray is an administrative division of the Indre-et-Loire department, central France. Its borders were modified at the French canton reorganisation which came into effect in March 2015. Its seat is in Vouvray.

It consists of the following communes:
 
Chanceaux-sur-Choisille
Chançay
Mettray
Monnaie
Notre-Dame-d'Oé
Parçay-Meslay
Reugny
Rochecorbon
Vernou-sur-Brenne
Vouvray

References

Cantons of Indre-et-Loire